"Fake" is a song written by Jimmy Jam and Terry Lewis and recorded by American recording artist Alexander O'Neal. It is the first single from the O'Neal's second studio album, Hearsay (1987). It is one of the artist's most recognizable signature songs, and a favorite of many O'Neal fans worldwide.

Meaning
The song's lyrics are a personal commentary, critical of a loudmouth – implied to be a groupie. The woman being criticized continues to change details about her wardrobe, personality and history with each successive date, causing the narrator's response that she is a fraudulent person. On the accompanying album Hearsay, "Fake" is preceded by a brief interlude in which a belligerent woman accidentally knocks a man's drink onto his shirt at a party and insists it was his fault. He and his friends defend themselves, eventually deriding her bad behavior as the song begins.

Release
The single was O'Neal's most successful song on both the US soul and pop charts.  "Fake" went to number one on the Hot Black Singles chart for two weeks, and peaked at number 25 on the Billboard Hot 100. The single was also O'Neal's most successful single on the dance charts, peaking at number seven. It initially reached number 33 on the UK Singles Chart in 1987, but would reach a higher peak of number 16 with the release of a remixed version in 1988.

In popular culture
 The song was later interpolated for Patti LaBelle's 1997 hit, "When You Talk About Love", repeating the "Patti Patti" refrain after the singer demands her background to say her name.
 The song was also a part of the Black Mirror episode "San Junipero". The main characters Kelly and Yorkie perform their first  dance to this song at Tucker's, an '80s style club.

Track listing
 12" Maxi (Tabu TBU 650859 6, 650859 6)
"Fake (Extended Version)" – 5:20
"Fake (Edited Version)" – 3:11
"Fake (Patty Mix)" – 3:10
"Fake (A Cappella)" – 2:20
"Fake (Instrumental)" – 4:35

 7" Single (Tabu ZS4-07100)
"Fake (Edited Version)" – 3:10
"A Broken Heart Can Mend" – 3:40

Personnel
Credits are adapted from the album's liner notes.
 Alexander O'Neal – lead vocals
 Jimmy Jam – drum and keyboard programming, keyboards, percussion, backing vocals
 Terry Lewis – percussion, backing vocals
 Jerome Benton, Jellybean Johnson, James 'Popeye' Greer, Jimmy Jam, Terry Lewis – fake fellas

Sales chart performance

Peak positions

References

External links
 

1987 singles
Alexander O'Neal songs
Songs written by Jimmy Jam and Terry Lewis
Song recordings produced by Jimmy Jam and Terry Lewis
1987 songs
Dance-pop songs
Post-disco songs